Legislative elections were held in El Salvador on 10 March 1974. The result was a victory for the National Conciliation Party, which won 36 of the 52 seats whilst the National Opposing Union (UNO) (an alliance of the Christian Democratic Party, the National Revolutionary Movement and the Nationalist Democratic Union) won only 15. However, the election was marred by massive fraud and the official vote counts were not published.

Results

References

Bibliography
Political Handbook of the world, 1974. New York, 1975. 
Anderson, Thomas P. 1988. Politics in Central America: Guatemala, El Salvador, Honduras, and Nicaragua. New York: Praeger. Revised edition.
Herman, Edward S. and Frank Brodhead. 1984. Demonstration elections: U.S.-staged elections in the Dominican Republic, Vietnam, and El Salvador. Boston: South End Press.
Montgomery, Tommie Sue. 1995. Revolution in El Salvador: from civil strife to civil peace. Boulder: Westview.
Webre, Stephen. 1979. José Napoleón Duarte and the Christian Democratic Party in Salvadoran Politics 1960-1972. Baton Rouge: Louisiana State University Press.

Legislative elections in El Salvador
1974 in El Salvador
El Salvador
Election and referendum articles with incomplete results